The Louisiana Natural and Scenic Rivers System was established in 1970, administered by the Louisiana Department of Wildlife and Fisheries, and includes approximately 3000 miles of waterways.

North Louisiana
 Bayou Bartholomew - 080401 
 Bayou D'Arbonne - 080605 
 Bayou de L'Outre - 080501 
 Bayou Dorcheat - 100501 
 Black Lake Bayou - 100702 
 Corney Bayou - 080607 and 080609 
 Middle Fork Bayou D'Arbonne - 080610 
 Ouachita River- 80101 
 Saline Bayou (Bienville Parish) - 100801

Central Louisiana
 Bayou Cocodrie (Concordia Parish) - 101601 
 Bayou Cocodrie (Evangeline Parish) - 060201 
 Bayou Kisatchie - 101103 
 Big Creek - 081608 
 Calcasieu River - 030102 
  Fish Creek - 081606 
 Little River - 081601 and 081602 
 Pearl Creek - 110202 
 Saline Bayou (Catahoula & LaSalle Parishes) - 101504 
 Six Mile Creek - 030504 
 Spring Creek (Louisiana) -060101 
 Ten Mile Creek - 030505 
 Trout Creek – 081607 
 Whiskey Chitto Creek - 030502

South Louisiana
 Amite River - 040301 
 Bashman Bayou - 041803 
 Bayou Bienvenue - 042002 
  Bayou Cane - 040903 and 040904 
 Bayou Chaperon - 041802 
 Bayou Chinchuba - 040904 
 Bayou des Allemands - 020201 and 020301
 Bayou Dupre - 041804 
 Bayou LaBranche - 041201 
 Bayou Lacombe - 040901 and 040902 
 Bayou St. John - 041301 
 Bayou Trepagnier - 041202 
 Blind River - 040401 and 040403 
 Bogue Chitto River - 090501 
 Bogue Falaya River - 040804 
 Bradley Slough - 090206 
 Comite River - 040102 
 Holmes Bayou - 090106 
 Lake Borgne Canal - 041805 
  Morgan River – 090202-5126 
 Pirogue Bayou - 041806 
 Pushepatapa Creek - 090301 
 Tangipahoa River – 040701 and 040702 
 Tchefuncte River – 040801, 040802 and 040803 
 Terre Beau Bayou - 041807 
 Tickfaw River - 040501 
 West Pearl River - 090201 and 090202 
 Wilson Slough - 090205

References

External links
Louisiana Department of Wildlife and Fisheries: Louisiana Natural and Scenic Rivers Descriptions and Map

Protected areas of Louisiana
Rivers of the United States